= Fisherman's Haven Provincial Park =

Provincial park of Prince Edward Island, Canada

Coordinates: 46°52′46.9″N 64°13′40.7″W

Fisherman's Haven Provincial Park is a provincial park in Prince Edward Island, Canada.
